Marlin Martin “Pat” Harder (May 6, 1922 – September 6, 1992) was an American football player, playing fullback and kicker.  He was inducted into the College Football Hall of Fame in 1993.

University of Wisconsin
After graduating from Washington High School, in Milwaukee, he enrolled in the University of Wisconsin–Madison.  Playing fullback for the Badgers, Harder led the Big Ten Conference in rushing and scoring in 1941.  In 1942, Harder was part of a team that went 8–1–1, including a 17–7 victory over the reigning national champion Ohio State Buckeyes, in which Harder scored 11 of the 17 points.  Harder left Wisconsin to join the United States Marine Corps in 1943 to fight in World War II.  Despite having a year of eligibility left when he left the Marines, Harder turned pro in 1946.

Professional career

Chicago Cardinals
Harder was drafted 2nd overall in the 1944 NFL Draft by the Chicago (now Arizona) Cardinals.  Harder was part of the Cardinals' "Million Dollar Backfield" which also included quarterback Paul Christman and halfbacks Marshall Goldberg and Charley Trippi.  He was the first player in league history to score over 100 points in three consecutive years, which he did from 1947 to 1949, leading the league all three years.  In 1947, the Cardinals won the NFL Championship (the Cardinals' last as of 2021). In the championship game, Harder kicked four extra points to help defeat the Philadelphia Eagles, 28–21.

Detroit Lions
Harder was traded to the Detroit Lions in 1951.  He helped the Lions win back-to-back NFL Championships in 1952 and 1953.  Harder retired from professional football in 1953.

After retirement
Harder served as an NFL official from 1966 to 1982, working as the umpire on the crew of legendary referee Jim Tunney wearing uniform number 36 from 1966 through 1969, then number 88 from 1970 through 1978, and again in 1982. From 1979-81, Harder wore uniform number 8, as officials during those seasons were numbered by position, rather than as an entire group.   

The most famous game he worked came on December 23, 1972, when the Pittsburgh Steelers won their first-ever playoff game on Franco Harris' Immaculate Reception against the Oakland Raiders. Harder was also an alternate, as was Tunney, for the 1967 NFL Championship game, famously known as the "Ice Bowl", when the Green Bay Packers defeated the Dallas Cowboys 21-17. 

He also served as vice-president of a car leasing company in Milwaukee.  He died in Waukesha, Wisconsin on September 6, 1992.

Harder was posthumously inducted into the College Football Hall of Fame in 1993.  In 2005, he was named to the Professional  Football Researchers Association Hall of Very Good in the association's third HOVG class.

The popular chant "Hit 'em again harder, harder, harder" was a University of Wisconsin cheer aimed at Pat Harder and can still be heard at high school and college games today.

References

External links
 
 

1922 births
1992 deaths
American football fullbacks
American football placekickers
Chicago Cardinals players
Detroit Lions players
Georgia Pre-Flight Skycrackers football players
National Football League officials
Wisconsin Badgers football players
College Football Hall of Fame inductees
Eastern Conference Pro Bowl players
Western Conference Pro Bowl players
United States Marine Corps personnel of World War II
Players of American football from Milwaukee
National Football League Most Valuable Player Award winners